Waikalasma is a genus of symmetrical sessile barnacles in the family Waikalasmatidae, the sole genus of the family. There are at least three described species in Waikalasma.

Species
These species belong to the genus Waikalasma:
 Waikalasma boucheti Buckeridge, 1996
 Waikalasma dianajonesae Chan, Chen, Rodriguez Moreno & Corbari, 2016
 Waikalasma juneae Buckeridge, 1983

References

Barnacles